Singapore competed at the 2008 Asian Beach Games, the inaugural Asian Beach Games, held in Bali, Indonesia from 18 October to 26 October 2008.

Singapore ranked 17th in the medal tally with one gold medal and two bronze medals.

Medallists 

Nations at the 2008 Asian Beach Games
2008
Asian Beach Games